Dagher may refer to

People with the surname
Assia Dagher (1908-1986), Lebanese actress.
Charbel Dagher, Lebanese academic.
Ely Dagher, Lebanese film director.
Manu Dagher (born 1984), Lebanese-Dutch football player.
Pierre Dagher, Lebanese actor and voice actor
Sandra Dagher (born 1978), Lebanese art curator.
Tony Dagher (born 1976), Lebanese-Canadian pharmacist.

Other
Deymeh-ye Dagher, a village in Iran.
Texaco Inc. v. Dagher, a court case.